The following is a list of events and releases that have happened or are expected to happen in 2021 in music in the Philippines.

Notable events
 January 25 – Pop rock band The Juans debuted at number 9 on weekly Billboard's Next Big Sound Chart.
 February 22 – Boy band Alamat debuted at number 2 on weekly Billboard's Next Big Sound Chart.
 April 30 – Boy band SB19 earns a nomination for Top Social Artist at the 2021 Billboard Music Awards, becoming the first Filipino (and Southeast Asian) act to be nominated for a Billboard Music Award in the United States.
 April–May – "Binibini", a song by male artist Zack Tabudlo, made into the top of local Spotify Philippines charts.
 May 11 – Boy band BGYO debuted at number 2 on weekly Billboard's Next Big Sound Chart.
 August 24 - Boy band BGYO re-entered at number 1 on weekly Billboard's Next Big Sound Chart, becoming the first Filipino act to do so.
 December 23 - R&B band South Border reunited with past and current members Jay Durias, Luke Mejares, and Duncan Ramos in the first live concert in the country since the COVID-19 pandemic at the Mall of Asia Arena.
 December 26 – alternative rock band UDD vocalist and keyboard Armi Millare has left from the band after 17 years.

Debuting acts

Bands

Solo artists
Ace Banzuelo
Adie
Angela Ken
Belle Mariano
BEY
BLASTER
Chen (Chen Pangan of Unit 406)
Diego Gutierrez
DJ Loonyo
Ez Mil
FELIP (Ken of SB19)
Leann Ganzon
Michael Pacquiao
Nonoy Peña
Sam Cruz
Kim Nemenzo
Muri
Huhsmile
Paul Pablo
Fana
Nobrvnd
Raven (Raven Aviso)
Rienne
Gigi De Lana
jikamarie
Meowfie
Mizael
ISSA (Issa Pressman)
Young Cocoa
}}

Reunion/Comebacks
Munimuni

On hiatus
Route 83

Released in 2021

First quarter

January

February

March

Second quarter

April

May

June

Third quarter

July

August

September

Fourth quarter

October

November

December

Concerts and music festivals
Most of the shows this year were supposed to be held in 2020, but postponed due to the COVID-19 pandemic. Some concerts may be held in late 2021 or postponed in 2022 depending on safety conditions related to the ongoing coronavirus.

This year featured the first live concert that was held since the start of the pandemic, the South Border Reunion Concert at the Mall of Asia Arena to crowd of about a thousand people.

Local artists

Virtual concerts

International artists

Music festivals

Deaths
 March 30 – Claire dela Fuente (b. 1958), businesswoman and singer
 April 23 – Victor Wood (b. 1946), singer
 May 20 – Zion Aquino (b. 1979), musician
 July 23 – Wally Gonzalez (b. 1950), Juan de la Cruz Band guitarist
 September 15 – Renee "Alon" dela Rosa (b. 1959), singer-songwriter
 November 2 – Mar Lopez (b. 1936), singer
 November 16 – Heber Bartolome (b. 1948), musician

Notes

References

Philippines
2021 in the Philippines
2021 in Philippine music
Philippine music industry